Sgurr a' Chaorachain is a mountain with a height of  in the Northwest Highlands, Scotland. It lies in Wester Ross.

A remote mountain, it is near the Glen Carron, and at the head of Loch Monar.

References

Mountains and hills of the Northwest Highlands
Marilyns of Scotland
Munros
One-thousanders of Scotland